This is a list of fellows of the Royal Society elected in 1993.

Fellows

Alan Astbury
Alan David Baddeley
Frederick Michael Burdekin
Timothy Hugh Clutton-Brock
David George Crighton  (1942–2000)
Richard Anthony Crowther
Sir Howard Dalton  (1944–2008)
Geoffrey Dearnaley  (d. 2009)
Martin Evans
Ian Fleming
Ludwig Edward Fraenkel
Sir Richard Henry Friend
Christopher John Raymond Garrett
Keith Glover
Michael George Hall
David Rodney Roger Heath-Brown
John Hughes
Robin Francis Irvine
Patricia Ann Jacobs
Michael Joseph Kelly
Kevin Kendall
Franz Daniel Kahn  (1926–1998)
Trevor Lamb
Sydney Leach
Angus John Macintyre
Michael Neuberger
Ian Newton
Colin Patterson  (1933–1998)
Colin Trevor Pillinger
Ghillean Prance
Edward Osmund Royle Reynolds
John David Rhodes
James Cuthbert Smith
Brian Geoffrey Spratt
David John Stevenson
Bruce William Stillman
Andrew James Thomson
Peter John Twin
Anthony Edward Walsby
John William White

Foreign members

Bruce Alberts
Lennart Axel Edvard Carleson
Richard R. Ernst
Jean-Marie Lehn
Motoo Kimura  (1924–1994)
Edwin Ernest Salpeter  (d. 2008)

References

1993
1993 in science
1993 in the United Kingdom